Squamicreedia  is a genus of duckbill from the family Percophidae. It is endemic to waters with sandy sea beds off northern Australia. It is a monotypic genus, containing a single species, Squamicreedia obtusa, the obtuse duckbill or obtuse sandfish.

References

Percophidae
Squamicreedia obtusa